The University of North Carolina Press (or UNC Press), founded in 1922, is a university press associated with the University of North Carolina. It was the first university press founded in the Southern United States. It is a member of the Association of University Presses (AUPresses) and publishes both scholarly and general-interest publications. UNC Press supports the University of North Carolina through publishing books and journals It receives financial support from the state of North Carolina and an endowment fund Its main offices are located in Chapel Hill.

History
The University of North Carolina Press was chartered in 1922 by a thirteen member board of directors focused on publishing scholarly works of its constituents. It was the first university press in the United States. The press still remains affiliated with the 17-campus UNC System that strives to advance scholarship and serve its regional and state communities.

In the late 1920s, the UNC Press was the first scholarly publisher to develop an book series focused on African Americans. By 1950, nearly 100 such volumes had appeared under its imprint, including famed historian John Hope Franklin’s first book, The Free Negro in North Carolina, 1790–1860, published in 1943. In the 1970s, the UNC Press was one of the first publishers of texts focused on women's studies, and  feminist literary and historical works. Both topical areas remain as cornerstones of UNC Press's publishing program today. The UNC Press also supported the Native American and Indigenous studies, a field of national and global interest that has grown significantly in recent years.

UNC Press partners with a variety of other leading institutions and public groups, including the Omohundro Institute of Early American History and Culture, the Center for Documentary Studies at Duke University, the Clements Center for Southwest Studies at Southern Methodist University, and the North Carolina Office of Archives and History.

In 2006, UNC Press started the distribution company Longleaf Services as an affiliate. Fulfillment for Longleaf is provided by Ingram Content Group. Through this wholly owned not-for-profit subsidiary, Longleaf Services provides economies of scale in back-end services for a growing group of university presses. Additionally, the Office of Scholarly Publishing Services is expanding its role within the 17-campus UNC System to support publishing originating at its diverse universities.

Output

Since its founding, UNC Press has focused on the publication of scholarly works while also creating one of the earliest and strongest regional publishing programs in the country.

As it approaches the centennial of its founding in 2022, UNC Press has published more than 6,000 books and maintains an in print backlist of over 4,000 titles.

UNC Press has won many book awards, including the National Book Award, the Pulitzer Prize, the Bancroft Prize, Frederick Douglass Prize, and the top prizes given by leading scholarly societies and respected organizations like the American Bar Association; the American Institute of Architects; the American Society of Composers, Authors, and Publishers; and the Royal Society of Canada. Over the years, UNC Press titles have won hundreds of major prizes in American and world history, religious studies, Latin American and Caribbean studies, American studies, gender and women's studies, literary studies, music, architecture, human rights, and legal studies.

Notable UNC Press authors include historians such as John Hope Franklin, Gerda Lerner, Gordon Wood, Mary Kelley, Jacquelyn Dowd Hall, Nell Irvin Painter, Glenda Gilmore, Timothy Tyson, Gary W. Gallagher, William A. Darity Jr., Tiya Miles, Laurent Dubois, Keeanga-Yamahtta Taylor, Cedric J. Robinson,  Robin D. G. Kelley, Kelly Lytle Hernández, and Louis A. Pérez Jr.; scholars of American and world religions including Carl W. Ernst, Catherine Brekus, and Anthea Butler; literary writers and critics such as Elizabeth Lawrence, Cleanth Brooks, Phillis Wheatley, Thomas Wolfe, Paul Green, and Wilma Dykeman; prominent scholars of the American South including Howard Odum to William Ferris; and North Carolina celebrities including David Stick, Bill Neal, Mildred (Mama Dip) Council, and Bland Simpson.

The press has published many multi-volume documentary editions, such as The Papers of John Marshall, The Papers of General Nathanael Greene, The Black Abolitionist Papers, and The Complete Works of Captain John Smith.

Notable published works of reference include the Encyclopedia of Southern Culture, the North Carolina Architecture, and the Encyclopedia of North Carolina.

See also

 List of English-language book publishing companies
 List of university presses

References

External links
 
Longleaf Services
The Office of Scholarly Publishing Services

1922 establishments in North Carolina
Press
Publishing companies established in 1922
North Carolina